The ICT Development Index (IDI) is an index published by the United Nations International Telecommunication Union based on internationally agreed information and communication technologies (ICT) indicators. This makes it a valuable tool for benchmarking the most important indicators for measuring the information society. The IDI is a standard tool that governments, operators, development agencies, researchers and others can use to measure the digital divide and compare ICT performance within and across countries. 
The ICT Development Index is based on 11 ICT indicators, grouped in three clusters: access, use and skills.

Top 30 countries 
The following is a list of top 30 countries as ranked by the ICT Development Index in 2013, 2015 and 2017.

References

Primary reference

Inline citations

Economic country classifications
IT infrastructure